Jonathan (died c. AD 58), also referred to as Jonathan the High Priest, was a first-century Jewish high priest and religious leader. Shortly after he was announced High Priest of Israel, he was killed in AD 58 by Antonius Felix, the Roman procurator of the province Judea. He was stabbed by robbers hired by Felix with daggers at the Temple.

Enmity with Felix
Felix disliked Jonathan, because he often got criticized by the latter about governing the Jewish affairs, and threatened to be reported to Caesar if not doing well as the priest was the one made recommendation to Caesar to send Felix to be the procurator of Judea. Felix persuaded one of Jonathan's most trusted friends, Doras, a citizen of Jerusalem, to hire robbers to kill Jonathan by promising to give a large sum of money. Doras arranged for some hired men to mingle with the worshippers in the Temple in Jerusalem, while they hid daggers under their garments. These assassins succeeded in killing Jonathan during a Jewish festival and were never caught. The main source that mentions this high priest is the Antiquities of the Jews by Flavius Josephus.

Ossuary
It is suggested that this Jonathan is the son of Theophilus ben Ananus mentioned on an Aramaic ossuary of the granddaughter of Theophilus, named Johanna. The inscription of the ossuary reads, "Yehoḥanah (Johanna) daughter of Yehoḥanan (Jonathan) son of Thefilus (Theophilus), the High Priest." Since many male descendants of Ananus ben Seth also became high priests in the 1st century CE, it is possible that this Jonathan is the son of Theophilus. However, the ossuary only refers to Theophilus as a high priest, so it may have been a different person. According to Tal Ilan, Jonathan was the eighth most common male Jewish name in Palestine.

Another possible identification for him is that he was Jonathan ben Ananus. It is possible that the title was restored to him for a second time after 14 years. This could explain why Josephus refers to him only by his first name rather than his full name.

Some historians believe that Jonathan's true killers may have been Jewish Sicarii, rebels against Roman rule infamous for assassinating enemies with sicae.

References 

1st-century High Priests of Israel
Ancient Roman murder victims
Deaths by stabbing